The Grammy Award for Best Rap Performance by a Duo or Group was awarded between 1991 and 2011, alongside the Grammy Award for Best Rap Solo Performance.  Previously a single award was presented for Best Rap Performance. 

The award was discontinued in 2012. All solo and duo/group rap performances have since been shifted to the revived  Best Rap Performance category.

Years reflect the year in which the Grammy Awards were presented, for music released from October a year and a half prior to September the previous year.

Recipients

Category facts
Most wins in this category:
The Black Eyed Peas, Kanye West, OutKast, P. Diddy, Dr. Dre, Jay-Z, Eminem and Krayzie Bone - 2 wins

Most Nominations in this category:
1. Dr. Dre - 8 nominations
2. P. Diddy, Jay-Z, Big Boi - 7 nominations
3. Kanye West, Andre 3000 - 6 nominations
4. OutKast, Beastie Boys - 5 nominations
5. Ludacris, Eminem, Snoop Dogg - 4 nominations
6. Naughty By Nature, Young Jeezy, Cypress Hill - 3 nominations

References 

Performance by a Duo or Group
Rapping